The Dave Evans Bicentennial Tree, a  tall karri tree, was pegged for climbing to celebrate Australia's bicentenary in 1988. It is in Warren National Park in southwestern Australia. Although it has been used as a fire lookout, it is used mainly as a tourist attraction. The lookout platform is reached by climbing 165 metal spikes hammered into the trunk.

The Bicentennial Tree is one of three lookout trees, along with the Diamond and Gloucester Tree. Dave Evans and Gloucester remain climbable by tourists, but Diamond Tree was closed in 2019. All three are near Pemberton, Western Australia. 

The tree was named after local politician Dave Evans.

See also
List of individual trees
List of named Eucalyptus trees

References

External links
 The Bicentennial Tree by Graham Evans

Individual eucalypts
Forests of Western Australia
Individual trees in Western Australia
Lookout trees
Australian bicentennial commemorations
Fire lookout towers in Australia